Ikemoto (written: 池本 or 池元) is a Japanese surname. Notable people with the surname include:

, Japanese manga artist
, Japanese mixed martial artist
, Japanese footballer

Japanese-language surnames